Martynas Paliukėnas (born 14 September 1993) is a Lithuanian basketball player for Juventus Utena of the Lithuanian Basketball League. Standing at 1.95 m (6 ft 5 in), he plays the shooting guard position.

Professional career
During the 2017–18 season, Paliukėnas played with King Szczecin in the Polish PLK. In April 2018, he won the PLK Best Defender award.

On 9 November 2019 he signed with Polpharma Starogard Gdański of the Polska Liga Koszykówki (PLK). 

On 11 February 2020 he signed with Trefl Sopot of the Polska Liga Koszykówki (PLK).

On 19 August 2021 he signed with CSM Oradea of the Liga Națională.

International career 
Paliukėnas won silver medal while representing the Lithuanian U-16 National Team during the 2009 FIBA Europe Under-16 Championship.

References 

1993 births
Living people
Basketball players from Vilnius
BC Dzūkija players
BC Statyba players
CSM Oradea (basketball) players
Lithuanian men's basketball players
Shooting guards
Trefl Sopot players